Décio Randazzo Teixeira (28 December 1941 – 28 October 2000), known as Décio, is a Brazilian former footballer who competed in the 1960 Summer Olympics.

References

1941 births
2000 deaths
Association football defenders
Brazilian footballers
Olympic footballers of Brazil
Footballers at the 1960 Summer Olympics
América Futebol Clube (MG) players
Pan American Games medalists in football
Pan American Games silver medalists for Brazil
Footballers at the 1959 Pan American Games
Medalists at the 1959 Pan American Games